GSAB may mean:

 General Support Aviation Battalion, a unit in the US Army's Combat Aviation Brigades
 giant intermediate barred spiral galaxy, galaxy code "gSAB"